Clady Circuit situated in County Antrim, Northern Ireland describes a motor-cycle road racing street circuit used for the Ulster Grand Prix. The Clady Circuit was used between 1922 and 1939 and an amended shorter circuit between 1947 and 1952.

History
The Clady Circuit, (i.e. The original course start line was situated near Loanends Primary School on the secondary B39 Antrim to Belfast Road. The event held on public roads closed for racing including the secondary B39 Seven Mile Straight between Antrim and Clady Corner including Christy's Brae, the primary A52 Belfast to Crumlin Road between Clady Corner and Thorn Cottage, a tertiary road north from Thorn Cottage to Greenmount near the town of Antrim (including a section of RAF Aldergrove) and from Greenmount to Muckamore Corner with the road junction of the B39 'Seven Mile Straight.'

The short Clady Circuit now ran from Clady Corner to Nutts Corner on the primary A52 Belfast to Crumlin Road and used a section of the primary A 26 Banbridge to Coleraine Road from Nutts Corner to Muckamore House near Antrim. For the 1953 racing season the Clady Circuit was abandoned for motor-cycle racing and the Ulster Grand Prix as part of the FIM Motorcycle Grand Prix World Championship was moved to the nearby Dundrod Circuit in Co Antrim.

Speed and Race Records
The lap record for the short Clady Circuit is 9 Minutes and 21 seconds at an average speed of  set by Les Graham riding a 500cc MV Agusta 4C during the 1952 Ulster Grand Prix. The race record for the short Clady Circuit is an average speed of  set by Cromie McCandless riding a 500cc Gilera also during the 1952 Ulster Grand Prix.

See also
Ulster Grand Prix
North West 200
Isle of Man TT Races

Sources

Defunct motorsportsport venues in Northern Ireland
Grand Prix motorcycle circuits
Sports venues in County Antrim
Motorcycle Road Racing Venues